MINEDUC may refer to:
Ministry of Education (Chile)
Ministry of Education (Rwanda)